Arturo Fernández Rodríguez (21 February 1929 – 4 July 2019) was a Spanish actor who appeared in numerous films since making his debut in 1954.

Life and work 
Fernández Rodríguez was born on 21 February 1929 in the city of Gijon, in Asturias. He started a professional career as a boxer, where he gained the nickname of "The tiger of the Piles". In 1952, he served in the military at Logroño; that summer he realized a course of escalation in Viguera's rocks, sleeping for one month in the schools of this town. He married the Isabel Sensat of Catalan in San Vicente of Montalt on 21 March 1967, and they separated in 1978. They had three children: Maria Isabel (1968), Arturo (1970) and Maria Dolores "Boby" (1975).

Fernández Rodríguez underwent stomach surgery in April 2019. He recovered from the surgery, but shortly afterwards suffered a fall. His health deteriorated and he died on 4 July 2019 at a hospital in Madrid from complications related to the fall at the age of 90.

Acting career

During his career, he was most known as a comedic actor appearing in films such as Un vaso de whisky (1958), Novios 68 (1967) or The Complete Idiot (1970). He usually played the role of a seductive and somewhat cynical gallant.

In television his most famous role was in the series La casa de los líos on Antena 3 between 1996 and 2000. In May 2007 he also played two twin brothers in the series Como el perro y el gato on TVE.

In theatre, he played the main role in, among others, in the play "La herencia" (1957), "La tercera palabra" (1966), "La playa vacía" (1970), "Tribute" (1980),"Romantic Comedy" (1983), "Chapter Two" (1985), "The Secretary Bird" (1986), "Mejor en octubre" (1994) or "Esmoquin" (2001)

Selected filmography

 Judas' Kiss (1954)
 Los Fernández de Peralvillo (1954)
 Las chicas de la Cruz Roja (1958)
 College Boarding House (1959)
 María, matrícula de Bilbao (1960)
 Rogelia (1962)
 Currito of the Cross (1965)
 Road to Rocío (1966)
 Cristina Guzmán (1968)
 The Locket (1970)
 The Complete Idiot (1970)
 Desde que amanece apetece (2005)

References

External links
 

1929 births
2019 deaths
People from Gijón
Spanish male film actors
Male actors from Madrid
20th-century Spanish male actors
21st-century Spanish male actors